Georges Foucart (11 December 1865, Paris – 1943) was a French historian and Egyptologist. He was the son of archaeologist Paul Foucart (1836–1926), a professor of ancient Greek studies at the Collège de France.

From 1898 to 1906, he was a professor of ancient history at the University of Bordeaux, afterwards serving as a professor of history of religions at Aix-Marseille University. From 1915 to 1928, he was director of the Institut Français d'Archéologie Orientale in Cairo.

Selected works 
 La religion et l'art dans l'Egypte ancienne, 1908 – Religion and art of ancient Egypt.
 Histoire des religions et méthode comparative, 1912 – History of religions and comparative methods. 
 Questionnaire preĺiminaire d'ethnologie africaine, translated into English and published as "Introductory questions on African ethnology",  Cairo, Print. Office of the French Institute of Oriental Archaeology", 1919.
 La Société sultanieh de géographie du Caire; son oeuvre (1875-1921), Le Caire, Impr. de l'Institut français d'archéologie orientale, 1921. (with Adolphe bey Cattaui).
 Tombes thébaines, nécropole de Dirâ ̀Abû'n-Nága, Le Caire, Imprimerie de l'Institut Français d'Archéologie Orientale, 1928 (with Marcelle Baud) – Theban tombs, the necropolis of Dirâ ̀Abû'n-Nága. 
 Le tombeau de Roÿ, 1928 (with Marcelle Baud; Etienne Drioton).
 Le tombeau de Panehsy, 1932 (with Marcelle Baud; Etienne Drioton) – The tomb of Panehesy.
 Le tombeau d'Amonmos, 1935 (with Marcelle Baud; Etienne Drioton) – The tomb of Amenmose.
In addition to his works on ancient Egypt, he published a few treatises associated with Madagascar, e.g.: Le commerce et la colonisation à Madagascar (1894).

References 

1865 births
1943 deaths
19th-century French historians
French Egyptologists
Scientists from Paris
Academic staff of the University of Bordeaux
Academic staff of Aix-Marseille University
Members of the Institut Français d'Archéologie Orientale
French male non-fiction writers
20th-century French historians